Karl Friedrich Anton Hermann 'Charles' Regnier (Régnier) (22 July 1914 – 13 September 2001) was a German actor, director and translator. He appeared in more than 135 films between 1949 and 2000. In the 1950s and the 1960s, he was one of the busiest German theatre and film actors.

Family life and upbringing 
Born at Freiburg in 1914, Regnier owed his name to his grandfather, a native Frenchman. Regnier was the first child of Anton Karl Regnier and Emile (Milly) Maria Friederike Harrer, born in Freiburg im Breisgau. His father was a general practitioner and Charles initially wanted to become a doctor. 

Charles Regnier grew up in Strasbourg and Badenweiler where his maternal grandparents owned the Schloss Hausbaden hotel. After his father's suicide in 1924, his mother first moved with her four sons to Heidelberg, and then to Montreux on Lake Geneva. When his mother contracted tuberculosis in 1929, the family decided to move to the sanatorium at Davos. Here, Charles met a number of celebrities, including the writer Klabund, who awakened Regnier's interest in literature and the theatre. Together with his brothers, Charles produced Klabund's comedy XYZ: For three actors in three acts for a performance in Klabund's private living room. His first acting performance was starring as the Countess Y in this piece. "As an actor I never again had the opportunity to play a lady, but often showed how one plays a lady," Regnier wrote in his personal memoirs.

Career 
Regnier's first engagement was in 1938 at the theatre at Greifswald, where he met actress and singer Pamela Wedekind, a daughter of the playwright Frank Wedekind. They married on 21 June 1941 in Berlin. In 1941, Regnier was invited by Otto Falckenberg to join the ensemble of the Munich Kammerspiele, where he remained until 1958. From 1946, Regnier worked as a drama teacher at the newly founded Otto-Falckenberg-Schule.

From 1961 to 1962, he was an ensemble member of the Wiener Burgtheater. Regnier preferred not to make a distinction between high art performances and entertainment, saying, "The public should find my work effective, entertaining, in short: agreeable."

Regnier lived in Germany, Italy and Switzerland. He died on 13 September 2001 after suffering a stroke in Bad Wiessee. He was buried in the Badenweiler-Lipburg cemetery, close to his childhood home.

His literary estate can be found in the archives of the Academy of the Arts in Berlin.

Selected filmography

  (1949)
 The Last Illusion (1949), as Bertram
 Royal Children (1950), as Count Larissa
 Die Tat des Anderen (1951)
 Decision Before Dawn (1951), as German Prisoner (uncredited)
 Captive Soul (1952)
 My Name is Niki (1952), as Newspaper editor Claus
 The Sergeant's Daughter (1952)
 The Chaplain of San Lorenzo (1953), as Police detective Morro
 Street Serenade (1953), as Sachetti
 A Life for Do (1954), as Maurice
 Cabaret (1954), as Music critic
 Sauerbruch – Das war mein Leben (1954), as Head of the psychiatric section
 Consul Strotthoff (1954), as Conrad Eylers
 Clivia (1954)
 Captain Wronski (1954), as Judge of the Volksgerichtshof
 The Witch (1954), as Dr. Harz
 The Phantom of the Big Tent (1954)
 Canaris (1954), as Baron Trenti
 Secrets of the City (1955), as Morton
 Hello, My Name is Cox (1955), as Police detective Carter
 Ein Mann vergißt die Liebe (1955)
 Oasis (1955), as Van Grouten
 Heroism after Hours (1955), as Marro the Magican (segment "Der Zauberer Maro")
 Heaven Is Never Booked Up (1955), as Borelli
 The Ambassador's Wife (1955), as Legationsrat Mattusch
 Island of the Dead (1955), as Father Markus
 Bandits of the Autobahn (1955), as Paul Barra
 Operation Sleeping Bag (1955), as Oberfeldrichter Dr. Kratz
 The Forest House in Tyrol (1955), as Milazzo
 Two Blue Eyes (1955), as Hergentheimer
 Alibi (1955), as Dietmar
 San Salvatore (1956), as Professor Dr. Monthé
 Magic Fire (1956), as Giacomo Meyerbeer
  (1956), as Stadtrat Praun
 My Husband's Getting Married Today (1956), as Niki Springer
 Kitty and the Great Big World (1956), as Monsieur Jeannot
 The Story of Anastasia (1956)
 A Heart Returns Home (1956), as Boerner
 Queen Louise (1957), as Talleyrand
 The Power and the Glory (1957, TV film), as The Governor's Cousin
 Beneath the Palms on the Blue Sea (1957), as Cesare, the Contessa's butler
 Der geheimnisvolle Dr. Mander (1957, TV film), as David West
  (1957), as Hartmann
  (1957), as Dr. Kolali
  (1958), as Richard Allhard
 A Time to Love and a Time to Die (1958), as Joseph
  (1958), as Polizei-Chemiker Dr. Wagenknecht
 Taiga (1958), as Becker
  (1958), as Roberts
  (1958), as Mr. Kenneweg, teacher
 The Journey (1959), as Capt. Ornikidze
 Dial M for Murder (1959, TV film), as Lesgate
 Joan of Lorraine (1959, TV film), as Sheppard / Alain Chartier
 Court Martial (1959), as Judge Schorn
 The Rest Is Silence (1959), as Police Inspector Fortner
  (1959), as Metternich
 Reclining Figure (1959, TV film), as Paul Weldon
 Mistress of the World (1960), as Norvald
 Emilia Galotti (1960, TV film), as Marinelli, chamberlain of the prince
 The Man in the Black Derby (1960), as Herr von Seelisberg
  (1960), as Ernst Schenker
 The Secret Ways (1961), as The Count
 The Nina B. Affair (1961), as Schwerdtfeger
 The Marriage of Mr. Mississippi (1961), as Sir Thomas Jones, Minister of Justice
 Bankraub in der Rue Latour (1961), as Camarro
  (1961), as Dr. Hauenstein
  (1962), as Dr. Kampmann
 Der Marquis von Keith (1962, TV film), as Marquis von Keith
  (1962), as Prosecutor Reeder
 The Counterfeit Traitor (1962), as Wilhelm Kortner
 Adorable Julia (1962), as Lord Charles Tamerly
 Lulu (1962), as Jack the Ripper
 Das Testament des Dr. Mabuse (1962), as Mortimer
 Freud: The Secret Passion (1962) (uncredited)
The Curse of the Yellow Snake (1963), as Major Spedwell
 Love Has to Be Learned (1963), as Kramer
 Miracle of the White Stallions (1963), as Gen. Stryker
 The Black Abbot (1963), as Detective Puddler
  (1963), as Dr. Alois Kämpfer, newspaper publisher
 Banana Peel (1963), as Le vrai Bontemps
 Les Tontons flingueurs (1963), as Tomate
  (1963), as Director
 An Alibi for Death (1963), as Dr. Hartleben
  (1963), as Charley Nelson
  (1964, TV film), as J. Robert Oppenheimer
 Der Prozeß Carl von O. (1964), as Defense attorney
 Condemned to Sin (1964)
 Sicher ist sicher (1964, TV film), as Commodore
 Angélique, Marquise des Anges (1964), as Conan Bécher, inquisitor
  (1965), as Ronald Bruck
 Shots in Threequarter Time (1965), as Henry
 Marvelous Angelique (1965), as Conan Bécher, inquisitor
 Code Name: Jaguar (1965), as Simon Walter
 Pleins feux sur Stanislas (1965), as Man with cat (uncredited)
 Doktor Murkes gesammelte Nachrufe (1965, TV film), as Badallas
 A Study in Terror (1965), as Joseph Beck
  (1965), as Doctor
 Das Leben des Horace A. W. Tabor (1965, TV film), as William H. Brown
 Berta Garlan (1966, TV film), as Klingemann
 The Strangler of the Tower (1966), as Mr. Cliften
 The Doctor Speaks Out (1966), as Professor
 Caligula (1966, TV film), as Cherea
 To Skin a Spy (1966), as Ehrfurt
 Once a Greek (1966), as Petit-Paysan
 Les Femmes Savantes (1966, TV film), as Vadius
 Run Like a Thief (1967), as Piet de Jonge
 Joséphine (1967, TV film), as Talma
 : Nach all den Jahren (1967, TV series episode), as Gunnar Gustavsson
 Marat/Sade (1967, TV film), as Marquis de Sade
  (1968, TV miniseries), as Kaminsky
  (1968), as Professor Sauermann
  (1969), as The General (voice)
  (1970, TV film), as Dr. William Chumley
 Slap in the Face (1970), as Finance minister
 Hier bin ich, mein Vater (1970, TV film), as Mr. von Griese
 Under the Roofs of St. Pauli (1970), as Night club owner
 Der Kommissar: Der Moormörder (1971, TV series episode), as Dr. Strobel
 Preußen über alles... – Bismarcks deutsche Einigung (1971, TV film), as Benedetti
 Die Münchner Räterepublik (1971, TV film), as Kurt Eisner
 The Night in Lisbon (1971, TV film), as Lachmann
 Oliver (1971, TV film), as Finanzdirektor Kaenel
 Kein Geldschrank geht von selber auf – Die Eddie Chapman Story (1971, TV film), as Superintendent
 Der Zeuge (1971, TV film), as Padre Ignacio
  (1971, TV miniseries), as George Baker
 Der Kommissar: Ein Amoklauf (1972, TV series episode), as Dr. Förster, Gefängnispsychologe
 The Stuff That Dreams Are Made Of (1972), as Prof. Vladimir Monerow
 Death Under Sail (1973, TV film), as Finbow
 Der Kommissar: Das Komplott (1973, TV series episode), as Jakob Bachmann
 The Devil's Disciple (1973, TV film), as General Burgoyne
  (1973–1975, TV Series, 26 episodes), as Detective Chief Inspector Georg Wieker
 Tod und Teufel (1974), as Lonely man
 Steppenwolf (1974), as Loering
 The Serpent's Egg (1977), as Doctor
 Fabian (1980), as Erfinder
  (1982), as Pharao (voice)
  (1983), as Mr. X
 The Roaring Fifties (1983), as Igor
  (1984), as Yvonne
 Rosa Luxemburg (1986), as Jean Jaurès
 The Passenger – Welcome to Germany (1988), as Silbermann
 Jenseits von Blau (1989), as The Professor
  (1998), as Professor Waldheim
 No Place to Go (2000), as Hanna's Father

Further reading
 Thomas Blubacher: Charles Regnier, in: Andreas Kotte (Ed.): Theaterlexikon der Schweiz. Vol. 3, Chronos, Zürich (2005) , P. 1469.
 Bernard Gasser/BE: Regnier, Charles. In Historischen Lexikon der Schweiz
 Jörg Hahn: Regnier, Charles. In: Neue Deutsche Biographie (NDB). Vol. 21, Duncker & Humblot, Berlin (2003) , P. 274.
 Anatol Regnier: Du auf deinem höchsten Dach. Tilly Wedekind und ihre Töchter. Eine Familienbiografie. Knaus, München (2003) ; also in audio-book format on 3 CDs, .

Notes

References

External links

1914 births
2001 deaths
German male film actors
German male television actors
German people of French descent
Commanders Crosses of the Order of Merit of the Federal Republic of Germany
20th-century German male actors
Actors from Freiburg im Breisgau